The World Cotton Centennial (also known as the World's Industrial and Cotton Centennial Exposition) was a World's Fair held in New Orleans, Louisiana, United States in 1884. At a time when nearly one third of all cotton produced in the United States was handled in New Orleans and the city was home to the New Orleans Cotton Exchange, the idea for the fair was first advanced by the Cotton Planters Association. The name "World Cotton Centennial" referred to the earliest-surviving record of export of a shipment of cotton from the U.S. to England in 1784.

History
The U.S. Congress lent $1 million to the fair's directors and gave $300,000 for the construction of a large U.S. Government & State Exhibits Hall on the site. However, the planning and construction of the fair was marked by corruption and scandals, and state treasurer Edward A. Burke absconded abroad with some $1,777,000 dollars of state money including most of the fair's budget. Despite such serious financial difficulties, the Fair succeeded in offering many attractions to visitors.

The Centennial covered , stretching from St. Charles Avenue to the Mississippi River, and was notable in that it could be entered directly by railway, steamboat, or ocean-going ship. The main building enclosed  and was the largest roofed structure constructed up to that time. It was illuminated with 5,000 electric lights (still a novelty at the time, and said to be ten times the number then existing in New Orleans outside of the fairgrounds). There was also a Horticultural Hall, an observation tower with electric elevators, and working examples of multiple designs of experimental electric street-cars. The Mexican exhibit was particularly lavish and popular, constructed at a cost of $200,000, and featuring a huge brass band that was a great hit locally.

On December 16, 1884, U.S. President Chester Arthur opened the fair via telegraph (two weeks behind schedule). It closed on June 2, 1885. In an unsuccessful attempt to recover some of the financial losses from the Fair, the grounds and structures were reused for the North Central & South American Exposition from November 10, 1885, to March 31, 1886, with little success. After this the structures were publicly auctioned off, most going only for their worth in scrap.

The site today is Audubon Park and Audubon Zoo in Uptown New Orleans.

References

External links

 The World's Cotton Centennial Exposition. Book chapter
 
 
 World's Industrial and Cotton Centennial Exposition Collection at The Historic New Orleans Collection 

 

World's fairs in Louisiana
19th century in New Orleans
1884 in Louisiana
1884 festivals
Cotton industry in the United States
Centennial anniversaries
Events in New Orleans